Sir Leslie Frederic Scott (28 October 1869 – 19 May 1950) was a Conservative Party politician in the United Kingdom, and later a senior judge.

Born in 1869, the son of Sir John Scott, the Judicial Advisor to the Khedive of Egypt, and Edgeworth Leonora Hill.
Scott was educated at Rugby School and at New College, Oxford. He was called to the bar in 1894 and took silk in 1909 as a member of both the Middle Temple and the Inner Temple. He remained a member for the rest of his career.

He was elected as Member of Parliament (MP) for Liverpool Exchange at the December 1910 general election, and held the seat until he retired from Parliament at the 1929 general election.

Scott was Solicitor General for six months in 1922, until fall of the Lloyd George-led coalition government, and was knighted the same year. He had hoped to be appointed Attorney General, but never reached that office.

He was sworn of the Privy Council in the 1927 New Year Honours, and after leaving the House of Commons, he returned to his private legal practice. In 1935 he was appointed as a Lord Justice of Appeal, and in 1940 became the senior lord justice.  Lord Justice Scott chaired the Committee on Land Utilisation in Rural Areas, established by Lord Reith in 1941; his report was one of the foundations of the 1947 Town and Country Planning Act.

He retired in 1948, and died in Oxford in 1950.

References

External links 

 
 
Catalogue of Scott's papers, held at the Modern Records Centre, University of Warwick

1869 births
1950 deaths
Knights Bachelor
20th-century English judges
Conservative Party (UK) MPs for English constituencies
UK MPs 1910–1918
UK MPs 1918–1922
UK MPs 1922–1923
UK MPs 1923–1924
UK MPs 1924–1929
Solicitors General for England and Wales
Members of the Privy Council of the United Kingdom
Members of the Parliament of the United Kingdom for Liverpool constituencies
People educated at Rugby School
Alumni of New College, Oxford
Members of the Middle Temple
Members of the Inner Temple
20th-century King's Counsel